Elections to the Mizoram Legislative Assembly were held in April 1979 to elect members of the 30 constituencies in Mizoram, India. The Mizoram People's Conference emerged as the single largest party and T. Sailo was appointed as the Chief Minister of Mizoram for the second time.

Chief Minister Sailo's refusal to grant undue favours caused dissension in his party which led to the fall of his previous government and imposition of President's rule in the Union Territory.

Result

Elected Members

See also 
 List of constituencies of the Mizoram Legislative Assembly

References

Mizoram
1979
1979